Tondoro Constituency is an electoral constituency in the Kavango West Region of Namibia. Tondoro Constituency was named after the village and mission station Tondoro, although the administrative centre is in the village of Mburuuru.

In 2013 the Kavango Region was split into Kavango East and Kavango West. Tondoro was formed from the western half of the former Kahenge Constituency.

Politics

As in all Kavango West constituencies, SWAPO won the 2015 regional election by a landslide. Joseph Sivaku Sikongo received 3,528 votes, followed by Peter Mutuku of the All People's Party (APP, 173 votes). For the 2020 regional election no opposition candidate was fielded, and the sitting SWAPO councillor was duly re-elected.

See also
 Administrative divisions of Namibia

References

Constituencies of Kavango West Region
States and territories established in 2013
2013 establishments in Namibia